Though the violet color is normally composed of blue and red light, violet color can also be monochromatic, composed only by violet light. Combinations of red and blue lights and monochromatic light of wavelength smaller than blue produce a similar effect for the human eye due to a second resonancy of the red-sensitive cone cells. 

Composed-light violet shows two colors when decomposed. Violet light from the rainbow, which can be referred as spectral violet, is composed only by a short wavelength instead. This monochromatic violet light occupies its own place at the end of the visible spectrum, and is one of the seven spectral colors described by Isaac Newton in 1672.

Violet light is at the higher end of the visible spectrum, with a wavelength ~380-450 nanometers (in experiments, people have so far seen to 310 nm). Light with a shorter wavelength than violet but longer than X-rays and gamma rays is called ultraviolet.

Violet objects are normally composed-light violet. Objects reflecting spectral violet appear very dark, because human vision is relatively insensitive to those wavelengths. Monochromatic lamps emitting spectral-violet wavelengths can be roughly approximated by the color named electric violet, which is a composed-light violet producing a similar effect to the human eye.

References

Light
Shades of violet